Stealing Chairs is the third studio album by Australian punk band, 28 Days. It was released in September 2002 and peaked at number 6 on the ARIA Charts and was certified gold.

Track listing
(Tracks 13 to 27 are all 4 seconds of silence)

Charts

Certifications

Release history

References

2002 albums
28 Days (band) albums